Now Is the Time is a 1992 album by Alanis Morissette.

Now Is the Time may also refer to:

Film
 Now Is the Time (film), a 2019 documentary film by Christopher Auchter

Music

Albums
 Now Is the Time (Brenda Fassie album), 1996
 Now Is the Time (Delirious? album) or the title song (see below), 2006
 Now Is the Time (Idrees Sulieman album), 1976
 Now Is the Time (Jeff Lorber Fusion album), 2010
 Now Is the Time (Nightmares on Wax album), 2014
 Now Is the Time!, by Polysics, 2005
 Now Is the Time: Live at the Knitting Factory, by Alex Blake, 2000
 Now Is the Time or the title song, by Harold Melvin & the Blue Notes, 1977

Songs
 "Now Is the Time", by The Crystal Method, 1994
 "Now Is the Time", by Delirious? from The Mission Bell, 2005
 "Now Is the Time (Jimmy James song)", by Jimmy James and The Vagabonds, 1976
 "Now Is the Time", by Ray Brown & the Whispers, 1966
 "Now Is the Time", by Sisters Love

See also 
 Now's the Time (disambiguation)
 Now is the time for all good men, a typing drill sometimes used as filler text
 The Time Is Now (disambiguation)